Green Lake is located in Glacier National Park, in the U. S. state of Montana. The lake is near the southern border of Glacier National Park, midway between Marias Pass and East Glacier Park, Montana.

See also
List of lakes in Glacier County, Montana

References

Lakes of Glacier National Park (U.S.)
Lakes of Glacier County, Montana